Michael Cormick is an Australian singer and actor, best known for performances in musical theatre in Australia and in the United Kingdom.

In Australia, his roles have included the Beast in the original Australian production of Beauty and the Beast, Munkustrap in Cats, the Pharaoh in Joseph and the Amazing Technicolor Dreamcoat, Sam in Mamma Mia!, Commissioner Grey in Eureka and The Narrator in Blood Brothers.

In the West End, his roles include Raoul in The Phantom of the Opera and Sir Percival Glyde in The Woman in White.

Awards

Mo Awards
The Australian Entertainment Mo Awards (commonly known informally as the Mo Awards), were annual Australian entertainment industry awards. They recognise achievements in live entertainment in Australia from 1975 to 2016.
 (wins only)
|-
| 1996
| Michael Cormick
| Male Musical Theatre Performer of the Year 
| 
|-

References 

Australian male musical theatre actors
Living people
Year of birth missing (living people)